The 1955–56 1re série season was the 35th season of the 1re série, the top level of ice hockey in France. Club des patineurs lyonnais won their first and only league title.

Final ranking
 1st place: Club des patineurs lyonnais
 2nd place: Chamonix Hockey Club
 ? place: CSG Paris
 ? place: Ours de Villard-de-Lans

External links
Season on hockeyarchives.info

Fra
1955–56 in French ice hockey
Ligue Magnus seasons